The Jensen Nunataks are a cluster of isolated nunataks in the interior of southern Palmer Land, Antarctica, about  northeast of Mount Vang. They were mapped by the United States Geological Survey from surveys and U.S. Navy air photos, 1961–67, and named by the Advisory Committee on Antarctic Names for Curtis M. Jensen, a glaciologist at Byrd Station in summer 1965–66.

References

Nunataks of Palmer Land